Judgement of Tormented Souls is the second studio album by Russian metal band Dominia.

Track listing

Personnel
 Anton Rosa − vocals
 Casper - violin, keyboards
 Daniel - guitar
 Papa − drums
 Alexander Goodwin - bass

2008 albums